Jordan Al-Dasuqi (born 29 November 1994) is  a Jordanian-American professional basketball player. He plays for the Jordanian national basketball team and Al-Jazeera Basketball Club.

High school career
Dasuqi played high school basketball for Clarkston High School. In 2013, he was named Clarkston High School's most-valuable player averaging 22 points, 4 assists and 5 rebounds per game.

College career
Dasuqi played for the Lake Superior State University college basketball team, In his freshman season, he averaged 5.5 points, 1.75 rebound and 0.97 assist. In his Sophomore season, he averaged 8.79 points, 2.12 rebound and 1.91 assists. In his Junior season, he averaged 9.86 points, 2.82 rebound and 1.15 assists. In his Senior season, he averaged 8.04 points, 2.81 rebound and 1.15 assists.

Professional career
Dasuqi signed with Jordanian Premier Basketball League side Al-Jazeera in 2019.

National team career
Dasuqi represented the Jordan national basketball team at the 2019 FIBA Basketball World Cup in China, where he averaged 1 point, 0.4 rebound and 0.2 assist.

References

External links
Lake Superior State Lakers bio

1994 births
Living people
2019 FIBA Basketball World Cup players
American men's basketball players
American people of Jordanian descent
Basketball players from Michigan
Jordanian basketball players
Lake Superior State Lakers men's basketball players
People from Clarkston, Michigan